Philip Akin (born April 18, 1950) is a Canadian actor.

Akin has had roles in major American films such as The Sum of All Fears, S.W.A.T., and Get Rich or Die Tryin'. He has also done much voice work, including voicing the character of Bishop for the X-Men animated series and Tripp Hansen in Monster Force.

Life and career
Akin was born in Kingston, Jamaica, as a middle brother of five sons. His parents moved to Oshawa, Ontario in 1953, and he and his brothers followed suit the next year. He has lived in Ontario ever since. Shortly after attending high school, Akin attended Toronto's Ryerson Theatre School. In 1975, he became the school's first acting graduate, landing a role just a few days later in a Shaw Festival production of Caesar and Cleopatra.

In 1983, Akin began studying Yoshinkan aikido and is presently a 5th degree black belt in that art. He has also trained in Jing Mo kung fu and t'ai chi ch'uan.

Akin first came to prominence in the early 1980s when he performed on the zany comedy series Bizarre. Other noteworthy roles include boxer Kid Cornelius in the "Shadow Boxer" episode of Friday the 13th: The Series (1987) and his regular role as the wheelchair-using computer expert Norton Drake in the first season of War of the Worlds, a Canadian/American television series (1988–90). His recurring role as Charlie DeSalvo in Highlander: The Series has also brought him much recognition. In Shake Hands with the Devil, he portrays Kofi Annan, then United Nations Under-Secretary-General for Peacekeeping Operations. In 2007, Akin performed at the Stratford Festival of Canada, a prestigious summer-long celebration of theatre held each year in Stratford, Ontario, Canada. He was cast in the title role of William Shakespeare's Othello, and also in the role of Crooks in the Festival's rendition of John Steinbeck's novella Of Mice and Men.
Philip Akin can also be seen in a long list of guest appearances on television series for example: F/X: The Series, Mutant X, Flashpoint (2008) and most recently, The Expanse (2015).

Akin is a founding member and was the artistic director (2006-2020) of the Obsidian Theatre Company, a Canadian theatre company comprising seasoned actors of African descent, devoted to the work of Black artists and creators. He won the Dora Mavor Moore Award for Outstanding Direction of a Play/Musical in 2012 for his production of Suzan-Lori Parks' Topdog/Underdog, which starred Kevin Hanchard and Nigel Shawn Williams. In his role he helped foster mentorship programs aimed at Black theatre directors.

In the final year of his tenure as artistic director of Obsidian, Akin was awarded the biennial Herbert Whittaker Award for Distinguished Contribution to Canadian Theatre - and was named one of the Canadian artists of 2019 by The Globe and Mail. Upon his departure from Obsidian, the theatre established The Black Shoulders Award in Aikin's honour, to be awarded to Black artists to pursue their craft.

Akin was the director for the Shaw Festival's 2020 production of Trouble in Mind by Alice Childress.

Filmography

Film

Three Card Monte (1978) as Monte Player
Running (1979) as Chuck Stone
Improper Channels (1981) as Motorcycle Cop
Gas (1981) as Lincoln Jones
Shocktrauma (1982, TV movie) as Sam Hooker
Covergirl (1964) as Cairo
Deadline (1964) as Student #1
Iceman (1984) as Dr. Fisterpoon
Martin's Day (1985) as Cop 1
The Park Is Mine (1986, TV movie) as Hardy
Prettykill (1987) as Joey
Nowhere to Hide (1987) as Harvey
Blue Monkey (1987) as Anthony Rivers
Switching Channels (1988) as Guard
Millennium (1989) as Kevin Briley
Stella (1990) as Police Officer
F/X2 (1991) as Det. McQuay
The Big Slice (1991) as Reggie / Regina
Married to It (1991) as Limo Driver
Liar, Liar (1993, TV movie) as Dr. Kerr
The Ref (1994) as State Trooper
The Stupids (1996) as Henchman #1
Fly Away Home (1996) as Air Force Reporter
Talk to Me (1996, TV movie) as Public Defender
...First Do No Harm (1997, TV movie)
Elvis Meets Nixon (1997, TV movie) as Cabbie
Time to Say Goodbye? (1997) as Airport Police Officer
The Don's Analyst (1997, TV movie) as Dr. Lusting
The Taking of Pelham One Two Three (1998, TV movie) as ESU lieutenant
Woo (1998) as Roger Smith
Airborne (1998) as Romeo Cortez
Down in the Delta (1998) as Manager
One Tough Cop (1998) as Insp. Cheney
Deep in My Heart (1999, TV movie) as Ob-gyn doctor
Pushing Tin (1999) as Paul
In Too Deep (1999) as Minister
Strange Justice (1999, TV movie) as Charles Ogletree
All-American Girl: The Mary Kay Letourneau Story (2000, TV movie) as Det. Albany
Who Killed Atlanta's Children? (2000, TV movie) as Police Spokesman
One True Love (2000, TV movie) as Mark
Left Behind (2000) as Alan Tompkins
Range of Motion (2000, TV movie) as Flozell
Bojangles (2001, TV movie) as Williamson
Pretend You Don't See Her (2002, TV movie) as Witness Protection Agent
The Sum of All Fears (2002) as General Wilkes
Cube 2: Hypercube (2002) as The General
The Skulls III (2002) as Captain Harlan
How to Deal (2003) as Mr. Bowden
S.W.A.T. (2003) as Hijacked Passenger (uncredited)
The Perfect Man (2005) as English Teacher
The Man (2005) as Second I.A. Agent
Get Rich or Die Tryin' (2005) as Reverend
Knights of the South Bronx (2005, TV movie) as Asst. Principal Hill
Bottom Feeder (2007) as Sarge
Shake Hands with the Devil (2007) as Boutros Boutros-Ghali
This Beautiful City (2007) as Police Chief
P2 (2007) as Karl
Taking a Chance on Love (2009, TV movie) as Jules Grandfield
Who Is Clark Rockefeller? (2010, TV movie) as Det. Lewis Cook
Prosecuting Casey Anthony (2013, TV movie) as Judge Belvin Perry
Robocop (2014) as Dr. Alan

Television
Night Heat (1985–1987) as various characters (7 episodes)
Friday the 13th: The Series (1987) as Kid Cornelius (1 episode)
War of the Worlds (1988–1989) as Norton Drake (24 episodes)
Swamp Thing (1991) as Bayou Jack (5 episodes)
Top Cops (early 1990s?) as Irving Robinson (1 episode)
X-Men (1992–1995) as Bishop / Lucas Bishop (7 episodes)
Highlander: The Series (1993–1995) as Charlie DeSalvo (17 episodes)
Traders (1996) as Carl Davison (7 episodes)
PSI Factor: Chronicles of the Paranormal (1997–2000) as Aubrey / Military Man (2 episodes)
Highlander: The Raven (1998) as Simon Clark (1 episode)
Goosebumps (1998) as Bob Erikson (3 episodes)
H2O (2004) as U.S. President Monroe
Caitlin's Way (2000) as Mr. Watson (4 episodes)
Friends and Heroes (2008) as Isaac / John Ralston (13 episodes)
Flashpoint (2008–2011) as Commander Norm Holleran / Commander Holleran (5 episodes)
Lost Girl (2011) as Tshombe (1 episode)
King (2012) as Drew Bannon (1 episode)
Covert Affairs (2012) as Greg McCarthy (1 episode)
The Best Laid Plans (2014) as Managing Editor (3 episodes)
The Book of Negroes (2015) as John Cartwright (1 episode)
The Expanse (2015–2016) as Craig (3 episodes)
In Contempt (2018) as Judge Cannon (1 episode)

References

External links

1950 births
Male actors from Oshawa
Black Canadian male actors
Canadian male film actors
Canadian male stage actors
Canadian male television actors
Canadian male voice actors
Canadian theatre directors
Emigrants from British Jamaica to Canada
Living people
Naturalized citizens of Canada
People from Kingston, Jamaica
Toronto Metropolitan University alumni
Canadian artistic directors